Cheesy may refer to:

Art, entertainment, and media
Cheesy (album), a 1993 album by En Esch
Cheesy (video game), a 1996 game for PlayStation
Cheesy Home Video, a 1992 video by Primus

Food
Cheese, a food derived from milk that is produced in a wide range of flavors, textures and forms 
Cheesy Peas, a fictitious food from The Fast Show
Cheesy Poofs, a Frito-Lay product

Style
Camp (style)
Kitsch

See also
Cheezies, brand of cheese curl snack food
Cheez Doodles, a cheese-flavored cheese puff
Cheese (disambiguation)